Elwood Cooke and Bobby Riggs were the defending champions, but were ineligible to compete after turning professional.

Tom Brown and Jack Kramer defeated Geoff Brown and Dinny Pails in the final, 6–4, 6–4, 6–2 to win the gentlemen's doubles tennis title at the 1946 Wimbledon Championship.

Seeds

  Geoff Brown /  Dinny Pails (final)
  Tom Brown /  Jack Kramer (champions)
  Dragutin Mitić /  Josip Palada (semifinals)
  Bernard Destremau /  Yvon Petra (third round)

Draw

Finals

Top half

Section 1

The nationality of FW Peard is unknown.

Section 2

Bottom half

Section 3

Section 4

The nationality of C Webb is unknown.

References

External links

Men's Doubles
Wimbledon Championship by year – Men's doubles